Apostle is a New York-based production company specializing in television production created by stand-up comedian and actor Denis Leary and his business partner Jim Serpico.  Apostle created the hit TV series Rescue Me about a post-9/11 FDNY crew and the drama in their personal lives.

In June 2007, Apostle signed a 3-year production deal with Sony to create at least 8 new television shows.

Productions

Current productions

Future productions

Past productions
 The Job (2001–2002)
 Rescue Me (2004–2011)
 Canterbury's Law (2008)
 Maron (2013–2016)
 Sirens (2014–2015)
 Sex & Drugs & Rock & Roll (2015–2016)
 Benders (2015)

References

External links
 Apostle - Company Website

Companies based in New York City
Television production companies of the United States